Othonna intermedia is a species of plant from South Africa.

Description 
This tuberous geophyte has no stem or a short stem. The leaves are concerntrated at the base of the plant. Up to three leafy bracts are found around the flower stems. The flowers are yellow.

Distribution and habitat 
This plant is known from the Northern Cape and Western Cape of South Africa. It is common on quartz patches in the Knersvlakte.

Conservation 
This species is considered to be near threatened by the South African National Biodiversity Institute. It is declining due to urbanisation, agriculture and mining it its habitat.

References 

intermedia
Plants described in 1949
Flora of South Africa